Laurence Bradford Packard was an American historian.

Early life
He was born in Brockton, Massachusetts in 1887. He studied at Brockton High School. In 1909, he completed his A.B. degree from Harvard University.

Education
He completed his PhD in 1921. His PhD dealt with the age of Louis XIV.

Career
He was a professor at the University of Rochester in 1913-1925.

He was a professor at Amherst College in 1925-1931.

Books
His books include:

 The Age of Louis XIV (1929)
 The Commercial Revolution (1927)

References

External links
 Google Books

1887 births
Harvard University alumni
University of Rochester faculty
Amherst College faculty
Year of death missing